Siot (character: ㅅ; , siot, North Korean: 시읏, sieut) is a consonant of the Korean alphabet. The Unicode for ㅅ is U+3145. Siot  indicates an [s] sound like in the English word "staff", but at the end of a syllable it denotes a [t] sound. Before [i] , semivowels (like ㅛ, yo) and the vowel ㅟ (ui) it is pronounced [ɕ].

Stroke order

References

Hangul jamo